This is a list of the Iraq national football team results from 1990 to 1999.

Results

1990s
1990

1992

1993

1995

1996

1997

1998

1999

See also
Iraq national football team results

References

External links
Iraq fixtures on eloratings.net
Iraq on soccerway.com

1990s in Iraqi sport
1990